Adva Zinober (born ) is an Israeli female former volleyball player, playing as a libero. She was part of the Israel women's national volleyball team.

She competed at the 2011 Women's European Volleyball Championship, and 2013 Women's European Volleyball Championship.

References

External links
http://www.scoresway.com/zgorzelec?sport=volleyball&page=player&id=2423
http://www.cev.lu/competition-area/PlayerDetails.aspx?TeamID=8259&PlayerID=19880&ID=674
http://www.zimbio.com/photos/Adva+Zinober/Women+Volleyball+European+Championship+Israel/yULZd_CGoGL
http://www.gettyimages.com/event/womens-volleyball-european-championship-israel-v-czech-republic-127400653#inbar-vinarsky-of-israel-spikes-the-ball-against-ivana-plchotova-and-picture-id126642935

1982 births
Living people
Israeli women's volleyball players
Place of birth missing (living people)